Soviet space exploration history has been well documented on Soviet stamps. These Soviet stamps cover a broad spectrum of subjects related to the Soviet space program. While much of the focus has been placed on the nation's notable "firsts" in space flight, including: Earth orbiting satellite, Sputnik 1; animal in space, the dog Laika on Sputnik 2; human in space and Earth orbit, Yuri Gagarin on Vostok 1; first spacewalk, Alexei Leonov on Voskhod 2; woman in space, Valentina Tereshkova on Vostok 6; Moon impact, 1959, and uncrewed landing; space station; and interplanetary probe; numerous stamps have paid tribute to more general astronomical topics as well.

Further reading 
 Gurevich, Iakov Borisovich and Vladimir Il'ich Shcherbakov. Kosmicheskaia filateliia: katalog-spravochnik. Moscow: Radio i sviaz, 1986, 126p.
 Kvasnikov, IU. S. Rossiiskaia kosmonavtika na pochtovykh markakh 1951-1995. Moscow: Novosti Kosmonavtiki?, 1996, 154p. 
 Kvasnikov, Yuri. Russian Cosmonautics On Postage Stamps. Falkirk: Astro Space Stamp Society, 1999, 35p. 
 Reichman, James G. Soviet and Russian philatelic items related to dogs in space. Mesa, Arizona, James G. Reichman, 2012, 97p.
 Sashenkov, Evgeniĭ Petrovich. Sovetskaia kosmonavtika v filatelii: katalog-spravochnik. Moscow: Glavnaia Filatelisticheskaia kontora, Soiuzpechati Ministerstva sviazi SSSR, 1967, 138p.

See also 

 Postage stamps of the Soviet Union
 U.S. space exploration history on U.S. stamps
 Space Race

References

External links 
 

 
 

History of spaceflight
Space program of the Soviet Union
Postage stamps of the Soviet Union
Space exploration on stamps